Chinle is a census-designated place (CDP) in Apache County, Arizona, United States. The name in Navajo means "flowing out" and is a reference to the location where the water flows out of the Canyon de Chelly. The population was 4,518 at the 2010 census.

Geography
Chinle is located at  (36.154718, -109.579040).

Climate
According to the Köppen Climate Classification system, Chinle has a semi-arid climate, abbreviated "BSk" on climate maps.

Demographics

As of the census of 2000, there were 5,366 people, 1,358 households, and 1,076 families residing in the CDP. The racial makeup of the CDP was 91.3% Native American, 6.4% White, 0.2% Black or African American, 0.2% Asian, <0.1% Pacific Islander, 0.6% from other races, and 1.3% from two or more races.  1.8% of the population were Hispanic or Latino of any race.

There were 1,358 households, out of which 52.8% had children under the age of 18 living with them, 42.6% were married couples living together, 30.4% had a female householder with no husband present, and 20.7% were non-families. 18.3% of all households were made up of individuals, and 2.5% had someone living alone who was 65 years of age or older.  The average household size was 3.84 and the average family size was 4.43.

In the CDP, the age distribution of the population shows 43.9% under the age of 18, 10.5% from 18 to 24, 25.8% from 25 to 44, 14.7% from 45 to 64, and 5.1% who were 65 years of age or older.  The median age was 22 years. For every 100 females, there were 93.6 males.  For every 100 females age 18 and over, there were 81.9 males.

The median income for a household in the CDP was $27,324, and the median income for a family was $26,182. Males had a median income of $25,321 versus $22,663 for females. The per capita income for the CDP was $8,755.  About 40.4% of families and 43.5% of the population were below the poverty line, including 52.6% of those under age 18 and 46.9% of those age 65 or over.

History 
In the Spanish colonial period, Chinle was a base for both trade and war. After acquisition of this area by the United States following the Mexican-American War, relations between the peoples deteriorated in the 1860s.

In the United States conducted a peace conference through their representative Kit Carson and the Navajo people in order to end the war between the Navajo and the U.S. The first trading post operated out of a tent and was established here in 1882. By 1885 a full-sized camp had developed. 

The Chinle Boarding School was established in 1910 by the Bureau of Indian Affairs (BIA). Khalil Anthony Johnson Jr., a PhD candidate at Yale University, wrote an article in 2014 that said, with this school, the federal government "established a permanent presence in [Chinle]", and that the BIA "effectively governed the town thereafter."

Initially anglicized as Chin Lee, the spelling of the name was changed to Chinle on April 1, 1941.

Chinle serves as a gateway community for Canyon de Chelly National Monument. The monument was established in 1931 primarily to preserve the archaeological sites and record of ancient human history.  Canyon de Chelly is unique among the National Park Service units because the park is located entirely on Navajo tribal land and it has a residential community in the canyon.

In the 1950s Chinle had a population with a variety of ethnicities, who tended to settle in separate areas. In addition to Navajo and non-Navajo Native Americans, there were Anglo white and Black people, and some of other races. The total population was under 200. Employees of the Bureau of Indian Affairs (BIA), one of the major employers, and school employees lived in their own compounds. The Chinle Boarding School and a public health clinic were the other two major employers.

By the 1950s the community had an issue with numerous stray dogs, who were not neutered nor spayed. Chinle had no leash law. On April 8, 1956, BIA authorities rounded up and shot stray dogs without warning, leaving some remains at people's doorsteps. The community protested when another dog shooting was ordered on September 23, 1956. G. Warren Spaulding, The General Superintendent of the Navajo Agency, ordered the dog shoot anyway, and did not notify the residents of his reason for rejecting their protest. Community outcry led to the installation of a gas chamber to euthanize unclaimed dogs.

Chinle's population was 150 in the 1960 census. 

In 2019, the television series Basketball or Nothing, featuring Chinle High School's basketball team, premiered on Netflix.

Gabrielle Durcharme of Cronkite News stated that the COVID-19 pandemic in Arizona "was hard on the community."

Education

Primary and secondary schools 

The area is served by Chinle Unified School District.

Schools in the area and served by the district include Tsaile Elementary School (K-8), Many Farms Elementary School (K-6), Canyon de Chelly Elementary School (K-6), Chinle Elementary School (K-6), Mesa View Elementary School (K-6), Chinle Junior High School (7-8), and Chinle High School (9-12).

The Chinle Boarding School, a Bureau of Indian Affairs (BIA) school, was formerly in Chinle until 1976, when it moved to Many Farms, though initially it had the same name post-move. The name later changed to Many Farms Community School (MFCS).

Tertiary education 
A branch of the Diné College is located here as well as a branch of Northern Arizona University and Navajo Technical University.

Health
The Navajo AIDS Network is based in Chinle.
Chinle Comprehensive Healthcare Center Chinle IHS is a full service Healthcare facility operated by the US Indian Health Service. It includes a hospital, emergency services, outpatient clinic, pharmacy, dental clinic and other health-related services. These services are reserved for Native Americans except in emergencies. The pharmacy is not open to the general public.

Government
Several Federal, County and Navajo tribal agencies are located in town.  The local government is located at the Chinle Chapter House.  The Chapter House serves as a town hall with a Chapter President, Vice President and Secretary/Treasurer as elected officials.

Other departments include the Navajo Police Department, Navajo Housing Authority, Navajo Tribal Utility Authority, Navajo Parks and Recreation, Apache County Office, Indian Health Service, Bureau of Indian Affairs, and the National Park Service.

Nearby attractions
 Canyon de Chelly National Monument
 Hubbell Trading Post National Historic Site

Notable people 

 Keats Begay, Navajo painter, was born in Chinle.
 Megalyn Echikunwoke, Nigerian-American actress was raised in the town by her single mother along with her three brothers.
 Robert Draper, Navajo painter
 Carl Nelson Gorman (also known as Kin-Ya-Onny-Beyeh), was a Navajo code talker during World War II, painter, and professor; born in Chinle.
 Russell Means, Native American activist who divided his time between Chinle and Porcupine, South Dakota."

See also

 List of census-designated places in Arizona
 Chinle Formation

References

External links

Census-designated places in Apache County, Arizona
Populated places on the Navajo Nation
Arizona placenames of Native American origin